Stephanie Yellowhair (December 13, 1976 – March 30, 2018) was a Navajo transgender activist who inspired the use of the slogan "Excuse My Beauty" while appearing on an episode of Cops in the early 2000s.

Biography
Stephanie Yellowhair was born in 1976 to Shirley and Skeet Yellowhair Sr, in Fort Defiance, Arizona. She was a member of the Táchiiʼnii and Zuni clans. She graduated from Window Rock High School and attended Cosmetology Academy for a degree. She was arrested on an episode of Cops for being a "public nuisance," and was arrested again in August 2011 for DUI. On March 30, 2018, Yellowhair died of chronic illness at the age of 41.

In popular culture
The phrase "Excuse My Beauty," has appeared several times in Rupaul's Drag Race, Latrice Royale released a song at a Drag Convention in Los Angeles 2018, called “eXcuse the beauty.” Royale said the song was inspired and written in homage to Yellowhair, who had "just passed away." Her confrontation with the police also inspired a scene from  Comedy Central's Reno 911!.

References 

1976 births
2018 deaths
LGBT Native Americans
Navajo people
Transgender women
People from Apache County, Arizona
LGBT people from Arizona
20th-century Native Americans
21st-century Native Americans